Skull bossing is a descriptive term in medical physical examination indicating a protuberance of the skull, most often in the frontal bones of the forehead ("frontal bossing"). Although prominence of the skull bones may be normal, skull bossing may be associated with certain medical conditions, including nutritional, metabolic, hormonal, and hematologic disorders.

Frontal bossing

Frontal bossing is the development of an unusually pronounced forehead which may also be associated with a heavier than normal brow ridge. It is caused by enlargement of the frontal bone, often in conjunction with abnormal enlargement of other facial bones, skull, mandible, and bones of the hands and feet. Frontal bossing may be seen in a few rare medical syndromes such as acromegaly – a chronic medical disorder in which the anterior pituitary gland produces excess growth hormone (GH). Frontal bossing may also occur in diseases resulting in chronic anemia, where there is increased hematopoiesis and enlargement of the medullary cavities of the skull.

Associated medical disorders
Rickets
Achondroplasia
Acromegaly
Basal cell nevus syndrome
Congenital syphilis
Cleidocranial dysostosis
Crouzon syndrome
Cryopyrin-Associated Periodic Syndrome (CAPS – PFS)
Ectodermal dysplasia
Extramedullary hematopoiesis
Fragile X syndrome
Hurler syndrome
Osteopathia Striata with Cranial Sclerosis
Pfeiffer syndrome
Rubinstein-Taybi syndrome
Russell-Silver syndrome (Russell-Silver dwarf)
Thanatophoric dysplasia
Talfan syndrome
Trimethadione (antiseizure drug) use during pregnancy
Beta-thalassemia (due to expansion of bone marrow secondary to increased hematopoiesis; see Extramedullary hematopoiesis)
Hallermann-Streiff syndrome

References

Medical terminology